This is a list and brief description of notable pipe organs in the world, with links to corresponding articles about them.

Historic organs

It is generally agreed upon that the world's oldest playable pipe organ is located in the Basilica of Valère in Sion, Switzerland. Built around 1435, most of the case is original, but only 12 pipes are original, as the rest have been replaced during restorations.
It is said that the organ in the church of St. Andreas at Ostönnen (Westfalia, Germany) is even older than the organ mentioned above. Its wind chests and divisions date back to 1425 - 1430, and half the pipes are still original. However, the case and key action were rebuilt in the Baroque period.
In the San Petronio Basilica in Bologna there is a Lorenzo da Prato organ built in 1475 with a lot of original stops, and is still playable after a restoration took place in 1986.
In the Old Cathedral (Duomo Vecchio) in Brescia (Italy) there is a Giangiacomo Antegnati (1536) - Fratelli Serassi (1826) organ. When in the 19th century the Antegnati was restored and enlarged, the priests of the church, in admiration of Antegnati masterpiece, asked Serassi to preserve all the old pipes.
The organ in Évora Cathedral in Portugal was built in 1562. Some of the materials used belong to a previous instrument from 1544. This organ is fully functional today. It had interventions in 1694 by Heitor Lobo, 1760 by Pasquale Gaetano Oldovini and 1967 Dirk Andries Flentrop.
In Wilhelmsburg Castle in Schmalkalden, Germany, there is a historic organ built between 1587 and 1589 by Daniel Meyer.  Notably its facade pipes are veneered with ivory.
In  in Sweden, there is an organ built in 1632 with 51 pipes. It was constructed by George Herman (dies ca 1655) and Philip Eisenmenger (dies after 1657) in Stockholm. The Wood carvings on the facade were made by the German master carver Mårten Redtmer (dies 1655), he also worked on the royal warship Wasa.
The Johann Woeckerl Organ in the Cathedral-Church of Saint-George in Sopron, Hungary, was built in 1633, but the pipes of its Holzflöte 8 stop were made in 1580. Among the church's congregation was Vitus "Veit" Bach, a miller whose great-great grandson Johann Sebastian Bach would compose the most celebrated organ music in the world.
The organ of St Patrick's Cathedral is one of the largest in Ireland with over 4,000 pipes. Parts of it date from a Renatus Harris instrument of 1695.
The oldest (complete) surviving church organ in the UK is that by Renatus Harris in St Botolph's Aldgate, and dates from 1744.
The Organ Historical Society maintains a citation list of historic North American organs.
The oldest fully functional organ in The Netherlands is that by Jan van Covelen in the Laurenschurch, Alkmaar. This organ dates from 1511.

The largest pipe organs in the world
There are many methodologies for comparison of organs according to their size. One of the most encompassing methodologies was described by Dr. Michał Szostak.

Civic and concert hall organs

Church organs

Largest church organ per country

Other notable church organs 

The world's second largest church organ is at the First Congregational Church of Los Angeles, California. Like Passau Cathedral (five organs, one console), it is really two separate organs playing from twin consoles. A Skinner Organ is in the front of the building built in 1931 and a Schlicker in the rear balcony. Today the organs play some 20,000 pipes with five manuals, 346 ranks, 233 registers, and 265 stops although it is continually being enlarged. Details and Stoplist. It has been restored three times, most recently in 1995 by Robert David. Recordings of this instrument appear on Telarc and Delos labels.
The Salt Lake Tabernacle organ in Utah is among the largest church organs in the United States and is considered to be one of the finest examples of the American Classic style of organ building. Inspired by the design of the Boston Music Hall organ (now in Methuen, Mass.), the original organ was built in 1867 by Joseph Ridges. At that time, the instrument contained some 700 pipes and was constructed of locally derived materials as much as possible. The distinctive casework has become iconic from its association with the famous choir, and is easily recognized around the world. The pipes are constructed of wood, zinc, and various alloys of tin and lead. When it was initially constructed, the organ had a tracker action and was powered by hand-pumped bellows; later it was powered by water from City Creek. Today it is powered by electricity and has an electro-pneumatic action. Though the organ has been rebuilt and enlarged several times since 1867, the original iconic casework and some of Ridges' pipes still remain in the organ today. The current organ is largely the work of G. Donald Harrison of the former Aeolian-Skinner organ firm. It was completed in 1948 and contains 11,623 pipes, 147 speaking stops and 206 ranks.
Aside from the multiple 100" and 50" stops on the Atlantic City Boardwalk Hall Auditorium organ, the most powerful organ stops in the world are the State Trumpet on the Great Organ at the Cathedral of St. John the Divine in New York City, and the Trompette Millitaire and Tuba Magna on the organ of Liverpool Anglican Cathedral, UK. Ophicleide (organ stop)  These distinctive-sounding stops operate on 50" of wind pressure and are each as loud as an entire large organ played on their own. 
The 1980-pipe Ferris Tracker organ in Round Lake, New York was originally built in 1847 for Calvary Episcopal Church in New York City. It was moved to the Round Lake Auditorium in 1888, and is considered to be the oldest and largest three-manual still intact in the United States.
The largest fully mechanical pipe organ in Europe is located in the St. Laurenschurch in Rotterdam, The Netherlands. It has 4 Manuals, 5 Divisions, 85 Stops, 7600 Pipes and is 23 meters tall. The organ was completed in 1973, built by Marcussen & Søn from Denmark.
The largest mechanical action organ in North America is a 4 Manual, 5 Division, 74 stop instrument, with 6,616 pipes & 126 Ranks. The organ built was by Casavant Frères of St Hyacinthe, Quebec for the Cathedral of Sts. Peter and Paul in Providence, Rhode Island in 1972. http://musiqueorguequebec.ca/orgues/etatsunis/providencespsp.html

Organs with notable construction methods
The Bamboo Organ at St. Joseph's Roman Catholic Church in Las Piñas, Philippines, some 12 km from downtown Manila, is made almost entirely of bamboo. The building of the organ was begun in 1816 by the Spanish Augustinian Recollect, Fr. Diego Cera de la Virgen del Carmen, and completed in 1824. It has been damaged repeatedly over the years but always restored. After its restoration in 1975 by Johannes Klais (Bonn, Germany), a yearly International Bamboo Organ Festival has been held every year (second half of February). Recordings of the organ (by titular organist Armando Salarza, Guy Bovet, Hans and Martin Haselböck, L.Ferdinando Tagliavini exist and) are available online from www.bambooorgan.org
The main exhibit in the Ontario Science Centre in Toronto, Ontario is a hydraulophone, a kind of water-jet organ. This pipe organ has hydraulic action provided by three water pumps and the keys on the organ console are water jets, so that each "key" (water jet) affords a richly intricate means way to independently control volume, pitch, and timbre affecting each of the organ pipes. See Opening and Lesson (how to play it).
The 5/80 Wurlitzer Theatre Organ in the residence of Jasper and Marian Sanfilippo of Barrington, Illinois, USA is considered to be the finest example of extension organ in the world today. It is the 3rd largest theatre pipe organ in the world.  The 2nd largest theatre pipe organ in the world is in Mesa Arizona at the Organ Stop and the largest theatre pipe organ in the world is the Carma Labratories organ located in Franklin Wisconsin.   The Sanfilippo organ was designed by David Junchen and installed in a purpose-built music room.
The Organ of the Basilica of St. Martin (Weingarten), Weingarten, Württemberg, Germany, is built around six church windows, with a detached console facing the church. The tracker action is entirely mechanical, sometimes spanning as much as 20 metres, and going around several corners. It was built by Joseph Gabler during 1713 - 1750. Photos and details can be viewed here.

Other organs 
 Old Salem in Winston-Salem North Carolina has a Tannenberg Organ that was originally built in the 18th century. The case was built in Salem and the other parts were built in Litiz. Tannenberg was 72 at the time of the organ's construction, and was not able to make the trip to Salem to install it. The installation was done by George Currie of Philadelphia. Restoration of the organ has been made several times. One undertaking, in 1910, was not satisfactory, and in 2004 an extensive restoration was completed in Stanton, Va. It was then moved into the Visitor Center, where it is played by the Music Director of the museum. A tour of the bellows is available to visitors.

See also 
 List of pipe organ builders
 Organ Historical Society

References

External links
International Organ Foundation online pipe organ database (9000+ organs in 60+ countries)
Organ Historical Society Database (Over 48,000 instruments, more than 6500 stop lists, as of June 2011)
The Top 20 - The World's Largest Pipe Organs
www.bambooorgan.org

Pipe organ